Hans Anton Aalien (born 21 September 1958) is a blind skier from Eggedal, Norway. He won a gold medal in the disabled skiing at the 1988 Winter Olympics event in Calgary, Alberta, Canada with a time of 18 minutes, 52.2 seconds. He participated in track and field athletics at four consecutive Summer Paralympics, from 1976 to 1988, and also competed in swimming in 1976 and 1984. He won one bronze medal in athletics and a silver and a bronze in swimming. At the Winter Paralympics, he competed in cross-country skiing in 1980, 1984, and 1988, and medaled in every event he participated in. He won a total of seven golds, one silver, and one bronze winter Paralympic medal.

He was born in Elverum, Norway.

References

1958 births
Living people
Cross-country skiers at the 1988 Winter Olympics
Paralympic athletes of Norway
Athletes (track and field) at the 1976 Summer Paralympics
Athletes (track and field) at the 1980 Summer Paralympics
Athletes (track and field) at the 1984 Summer Paralympics
Athletes (track and field) at the 1988 Summer Paralympics
Paralympic swimmers of Norway
Swimmers at the 1976 Summer Paralympics
Swimmers at the 1984 Summer Paralympics
Paralympic cross-country skiers of Norway
Cross-country skiers at the 1980 Winter Paralympics
Cross-country skiers at the 1984 Winter Paralympics
Cross-country skiers at the 1988 Winter Paralympics
Paralympic gold medalists for Norway
Paralympic silver medalists for Norway
Paralympic bronze medalists for Norway
Visually impaired category Paralympic competitors
Medalists at the 1980 Winter Paralympics
Medalists at the 1984 Winter Paralympics
Medalists at the 1988 Winter Paralympics
Norwegian male cross-country skiers
Medalists at the 1976 Summer Paralympics
Medalists at the 1980 Summer Paralympics
Medalists at the 1984 Summer Paralympics
Paralympic medalists in athletics (track and field)
Paralympic medalists in cross-country skiing
Paralympic medalists in swimming
People from Elverum
Norwegian male breaststroke swimmers
Sportspeople from Innlandet
Norwegian male middle-distance runners
Norwegian male high jumpers
Norwegian male long jumpers
Paralympic middle-distance runners
Paralympic high jumpers
Paralympic long jumpers
20th-century Norwegian people
Norwegian blind people